Ammonium sulfite is the ammonium salt of sulfurous acid with the chemical formula (NH4)2SO3.

Preparation
Ammonium sulfite can be prepared by the reaction of ammonia with sulfur dioxide in aqueous solution:

2 NH3 + SO2 + H2O → (NH4)2SO3

Ammonium sulfite is produced in gas scrubbers, now obsolete, consisting of ammonium hydroxide to remove sulfur dioxide from emissions from power plants.  The conversion is the basis of the Walther Process. The resulting ammonium sulfite can be air oxidized to give ammonium sulfate.

Uses
Ammonium sulfite is the precursor to ammonium thiosulfate, by reaction with elemental sulfur.

Niche
For cosmetics, ammonium sulfite is used as a hair straightening agent and a hair waving agent. Ammonium based hair products have been made to replace sodium hydroxide-based products due to the destructive nature of sodium hydroxide on hair.

The most common food product with ammonium sulfite is caramel coloring E150d. According to the FDA, caramel coloring contains ammonium, potassium, or sodium sulfite.

Ammonium sulfite is used as a preservative for fixers in photography. When film photographs are being developed ammonium sulfite can be one of the reducing agents used to preserve the hypo (sodium thiosulfate or ammonium thiosulfate).

Ammonium sulfite can also be used in the making of bricks. The bricks made using ammonium sulfite are mainly used for blast furnace linings.

Ammonium sulfite can be included in lubricants for cold metal working. The lubricants are intended to reduce friction to keep heat production down and keep impurities out of the metals.

Chemical properties
Ammonium sulfite is a reducing agent. It emits sulfur dioxide and oxides of nitrogen upon heating to decomposition.

The specific gravity of ammonium sulfite is 1.41. The refractive index of ammonium sulfite is 1.515.

References

Ammonium compounds
Sulfites